Carlos Manuel Gouveia Silva (born 24 November 1985), known as Carlos Manuel, is a Portuguese professional footballer who plays for Associação Desportiva Porto da Cruz as a right back.

Club career
Born in Caracas, Venezuela to Portuguese parents, Carlos Manuel returned to the land of his ancestors and settled in the island of Madeira, where he would spend his entire professional career. He started out at U.D. Santana, then signed with C.D. Nacional for his last two formative years.

After five seasons in the lower leagues with A.D. Camacha, Carlos Manuel joined C.F. União in the 2010 off-season. He played only seven games in his first year, as his team won the third division championship; his professional debut came on 21 August 2011, when he featured the full 90 minutes in a 3–2 home win over C.D. Aves in the Segunda Liga.

Another promotion befell at the end of the 2014–15 campaign, and Carlos Manuel contributed to this feat with 26 matches (24 starts). He made his debut in the Primeira Liga on 26 October 2015, coming on as a 64th-minute substitute for Joãozinho in a 0–1 away loss against C.F. Os Belenenses.

References

External links

1985 births
Living people
Portuguese people of Venezuelan descent
Venezuelan emigrants to Portugal
Footballers from Caracas
Portuguese footballers
Association football defenders
Primeira Liga players
Liga Portugal 2 players
Segunda Divisão players
C.D. Nacional players
C.F. União players